The Georgian Intelligence Service (GIS) (sakartvelos dazvervis samsakhuri) is a national intelligence agency of Georgia, with its headquarters in Tbilisi. The current head of the service is Shalva Lomidze, appointed in 2020.

The GIS is directly subordinated to the Prime Minister of Georgia. It is responsible for providing national security intelligence assessment and conducting counter-intelligence duties abroad.

History
After the declaration of independence from the Soviet Union in 1991, Georgia established its own intelligence agency, the Service for Information and Intelligence (საინფორმაციო–სადაზვერვო სამსახური), on the basis of the Soviet-era Committee for State Security. The Georgian KGB was notable in that it was considered to be the one of the most effective of the KGB's regional Soviet branches, under the command of Aleksi Inauri and Givi Gumbaridze for most of its existence. From 1993 to 1997, the SII functioned as the Chief Directorate for Foreign Intelligence (საგარეო დაზვერვის მთავარი სამმართველო) under the Ministry for State Security. On September 19, 1997, the agency was transformed into an independent State Intelligence Department (დაზვერვის სახელმწიფო დეპარტამენტი), with two regional divisions for Adjara and Abkhazia. Being briefly under the Ministry for State Security from 2004 to 2005, the agency was again made independent as the Foreign Intelligence Special Service (საგარეო დაზვერვის სპეციალური სამსახური) on January 24, 2005. The current name—Georgian Intelligence Service—was adopted in compliance with the new intelligence legislation passed in the Parliament of Georgia on April 27, 2010.

Structure
The GIS consists of five principal subdivisions. These are:
 Analytical Directorate
 Information Directorate
 Security Directorate
 Administrative Directorate
 Training Center

Heads of Georgian intelligence agency (1997–present)
 Avtandil Ioseliani (September 1997 – February 2004)
 Valeri Chkheidze (February–June 2004)
 Batu Kutelia (June–October 2004)
 Anna Zhvania (October 2004 – February 2008)
 Gela Bezhuashvili (February 2008 – December 2013)
 Davit Sujashvili (December 2013 – September 2019)
 Levan Izoria (September 2019 – 2020)
Shalva Lomidze (February 2020-present)

References

Intelligence agencies
Government of Georgia (country)
Government agencies established in 1997
1997 establishments in Georgia (country)